Sylvio Tabet (born in Beirut, Lebanon) is a Lebanese filmmaker and Producer. The only movie he directed was Beastmaster 2: Through the Portal of Time.

Some of his books that have been published include A Journey to Shanti and Repetitions.

Selected filmography
Dead Ringers, 1988 – Executive Producer
The Cotton Club, 1984 – Co-Producer
The Beastmaster, 1982 – Executive Producer
Evilspeak, 1981 – Co-Producer
Fade to Black, 1980 – Executive Producer
Bilitis, 1977 – Executive Producer

Resources

Official website
A Journey to Shanti website

References

Lebanese film directors
Living people
Artists from Beirut
Year of birth missing (living people)